General elections were held in Malta between 3 and 11 November 1854.

Background
The elections were held under the 1849 constitution, which provided for an 18-member Government Council, of which ten members would be appointed and eight elected.

Results
A total of 4,348 people were registered to vote, of which 3,882 cast votes, giving a turnout of 89%.

References

General elections in Malta
Malta
1854 in Malta
November 1854 events